Büyükyaka is a village in the Yeşilova District of Burdur Province in Turkey. Its population is 269 (2021).

References

Villages in Yeşilova District